This is a list of episodes from the 1967 Speed Racer TV series, released in the U.S. as Speed Racer.

1967 TV series

References

External links
Epguides

Episodes
Speed Racer